Hypanis may refer to:

 The Ancient Greek name of the Southern Bug river in Southern Ukraine
 The Ancient Greek name of the Kuban River in Southern Russia
 The Ancient Greek name of the Beas River in the Punjab state of India, also called Hyphasis
 Hypanis (bivalve), a genus of cockles
 Hypanis, an invalid name for a brush-footed butterfly genus, now Byblia